Batase may refer to:

Batase, Sindhupalchok, village in Bagmati Zone, Nepal
Batase, Kavrepalanchok, village in Bagmati Zone, Nepal
Batase, Khotang, village in Sagarmatha Zone, Nepal
Batase, Terhathum, village in Kosi Zone, Nepal